Jiasian District is a rural district in Kaohsiung City, Taiwan. Located far from the coast, the township is regarded as a gateway to Taiwan's Central Mountain Range.

History

Qing Dynasty
During the reign of Qianlong Emperor of Qing Dynasty, there was a person named Jiasian who came to the area to develop the land. Later on, people from Fujian and Guangdong migrated there to settle down. The government also established an office in the area for administration purpose.

Empire of Japan
After the handover of Taiwan from Qing Dynasty to Empire of Japan in 1895, the government established Aliguan police station in the area and applied police presence in 1902. In 1905, more than 2,000 Japanese people migrated to the area to work in camphor production by establishing Taiwan Camphor Production Enterprise. In 1920, the area was named Jiasian Village. Local and legislative offices were established including village chief and committee members. In 1942, tribal societies were further established in each village with one leader for each society.

Republic of China
After the handover of Taiwan from Japan to the Republic of China in 1945, Jiasian was organized as a rural township of Kaohsiung County. On 25 December 2010, Kaohsiung County was merged with Kaohsiung City and Jiasian was upgraded to a district of the city.

In August 2019, some residents living in high-risk areas of Jiasian District were evacuated from their homes after heavy rain and flash flooding.

Geography
Area: 124.03 km2
Population: 5,649 people (January 2023)

Administrative divisions
 Baolong Village (寶隆里)
 Datian Village (大田里)
 Dong'an Village (東安里)
 Guanshan Village
 He'an Village (和安里)
 Xi'an Village (西安里)
 Siaolin Village (Xiaolin)

In Taiwan, "village" (里) is a level of administrative division that under a rural township. The main town of Jiasian is divided into three villages: Dong'an, Xi'an, and He'an.

Economy
Situated at the intersection of Highway 20 (the Southern Cross-Island Highway) and Highway 21, Jiasian's downtown serves as a market center for local farmers and tourists. The most famous local crop is taro. Shops sell taro-flavored ice cream, taro cookies, and other taro products. The township is also known for its bamboo shoots and plums.

Tourist attractions
 Cemetery of Zhenghaijun
 Jiaxian Bridge
 Jiasianpu Memorial Monument
 Jiasian Water Park
 Jiasian Petrified Fossil Museum
 Mount Baiyun
 Mount Liouyi
 Mount Neiying
 Mount Waiying
 Mount Zion, a Christian hamlet.
 Xiaolin Pingpu Cultural Museum
 Xiaolin Village Memorial Park

Transportation

Bus station in the district is Jiaxian Station of Kaohsiung Bus.

See also
 Kaohsiung

References

Districts of Kaohsiung
Taiwan placenames originating from Formosan languages
Taivoan people